This is the results breakdown of the local elections held in Andalusia on 3 April 1979. The following tables show detailed results in the autonomous community's most populous municipalities, sorted alphabetically.

Overall

City control
The following table lists party control in the most populous municipalities, including provincial capitals (shown in bold).

Municipalities

Alcalá de Guadaíra
Population: 42,227

Algeciras
Population: 92,273

Almería
Population: 133,844

Antequera
Population: 41,608

Benalmádena
Population: 11,411

Cádiz
Population: 153,327

Chiclana de la Frontera
Population: 35,289

Córdoba
Population: 269,998

Dalías
Population: 28,419

Dos Hermanas
Population: 49,103

Écija
Population: 35,503

El Puerto de Santa María
Population: 51,007

Fuengirola
Population: 27,327

Granada
Population: 225,034

Huelva
Population: 122,494

Jaén
Population: 88,968

Jerez de la Frontera
Population: 180,098

La Línea de la Concepción
Population: 57,255

Linares
Population: 55,322

Málaga
Population: 454,882

Marbella
Population: 55,537

Morón de la Frontera
Population: 28,091

Motril
Population: 38,617

Ronda
Population: 31,895

San Fernando
Population: 67,614

Sanlúcar de Barrameda
Population: 47,558

Seville

Population: 622,532

Utrera
Population: 38,240

Vélez-Málaga
Population: 42,532

References

Andalusia
1979